Live at Luna Park is the seventh live album and video by American progressive metal band Dream Theater, released on November 5, 2013, through Eagle Rock Entertainment. The concert film was produced by Over The Edge Productions and directed by Mike Leonard. The album is available as a two-disc DVD, single-disc Blu-ray, 2DVD/3CD, Blu-ray/3CD, and a deluxe edition box set including all three formats with a 40-page book. Both the album and video are also available as digital downloads.

The album was recorded over two nights at Luna Park Stadium in Buenos Aires, the complete show of disc 1 on August 19, 2012, and the bonus tracks of disc 2 on August 20, 2012. It is Dream Theater's first live recording to feature drummer Mike Mangini, following Mike Portnoy's departure in 2010. At over 195 minutes, it is Dream Theater's longest album.

Track listing

The band toured for about 15 months, performing in 35 countries, supporting their commercially successful studio album, A Dramatic Turn of Events, released in 2011. The track list is primarily based on the songs from this album.

Special edition CD 
The Special Edition 6-disc set includes the 2 DVDs and the Blu-ray as specified above as well as the audio tracks on a 3-disc set.

Personnel
 James LaBrie – lead vocals
 John Petrucci – guitars, backing vocals
 Jordan Rudess – keyboards, keytar, continuum, lap steel guitar, iPad app Morphwiz
 John Myung – bass, Moog Taurus pedals
 Mike Mangini – drums

String quartet
 Oleg Pishenin – 1st violin
 Serdar Geldymuradov – 2nd violin
 Joëlle Perdaens – viola
 Néstor Tedesco – violincello

Other 

Hugh Syme - cover art

Charts

Albums charts

Video charts

References

Dream Theater video albums
Dream Theater live albums
2013 live albums
Albums recorded at Estadio Luna Park